Dickinson Independent School District is a school district based in Dickinson, Texas, United States in Greater Houston.

DISD serves most of the city of Dickinson as well as portions of the cities of La Marque, League City, and Texas City and some houses in unincorporated Galveston County (including most of Bacliff and all of San Leon).

All of the DISD catchment area is also served by the College of the Mainland.

In 2009, the school district was rated "academically acceptable" by the Texas Education Agency.

History

In the 2000s, rising real estate costs in Galveston forced many families to move to other areas, including League City and Texas City. This meant an influx of children out of Galveston ISD and into other school districts like Dickinson ISD.

Standardized dress
All DISD students are required to wear "standardized dress", which is similar to school uniforms. 
In 2014 DISD did away with the standardized dress code.

Schools

Secondary schools

High schools
 Dickinson High School  9-12

Junior high schools
 McAdams Junior High School (Dickinson) 7-8
 Kranz Junior High School  Named after Gene Kranz former NASA flight director who is a longtime resident of the city.

Primary schools

Middle schools
 Dunbar Middle School (Unincorporated Galveston County, Dickinson address) 5-6
 John and Shamarion Barber Middle School (Dickinson) 5-6
 Elva C. Lobit Middle School Dickinson (Dickinson) 5-6

Elementary schools

 Bay Colony Elementary School (League City) grades PK-4
 Hughes Road Elementary School (Dickinson) grades PK-4
 Kenneth E. Little Elementary School (Unincorporated Galveston County, Bacliff address) grades PK-4
 Jake Silbernagel Elementary School (Unincorporated Galveston County, Dickinson address) grades PK-4
 San Leon Elementary School (Unincorporated Galveston County, Dickinson address) grades PK-4
Calder Road Elementary (League City, Texas) grades PK-4
Louis G. Lobit Elementary School (Dickinson) grades PK-4

See also

List of school districts in Texas

References

External links

 

School districts in Galveston County, Texas